Cosmic Trigger II: Down to Earth is the second book in the Cosmic Trigger series, a three-volume autobiographical and philosophical work by Robert Anton Wilson.

First published in 1991, Cosmic Trigger II continues where Cosmic Trigger I: The Final Secret of the Illuminati left off, as well as being a set piece in itself. Wilson continues the Illuminati-based synchronicities that have taken place since Cosmic Trigger I was first published. The book is an exploration into the future of cyberspace; the peculiarities of Irish jurisprudence; links to the Mafia, the CIA and the Catholic Church; anal-eroticism in the White House; the Dog Castrator of Palm Springs and more. The book combines humour, twists in logic and zen-like koans to get its messages across.

The book is made up of ninety-four short chapters, with the main themes interwoven throughout in a non-linear fashion. In part, this volume of the series outlines Wilson’s intellectual development, from his religious education under the (‘sadistic’) nuns at Catholic school, through to his materialist-atheistic standpoint as an engineering student, and his eventual development of the ‘model agnosticism’ which shapes much of his published work. Along the way he discusses becoming a Trotskyist when he was seventeen, and his time as an Objectivist, while under the influence of the work of Ayn Rand.

Other recurring themes relate to conspiracies, involving the Vatican and allegedly freemasonic societies such as P2. He discusses the controversial death of Roberto Calvi; who was known in some quarters of the press as ‘God’s Banker,’ because of his ties to the Vatican Bank. Elsewhere, a plethora of other topics are touched upon, including Aleister Crowleyean magick ritual, Wilson’s love of movies, virtual reality, Jungian Synchronicity, and the exponential growth of global information.

Wilson wrote the book while the first Gulf war was in progress, and the dedication at the beginning of the book announces that the work is against the ‘makers of war’. Accordingly, many of the chapters feature anti-war quotes beneath the chapter titles, from figures ranging from William Tecumseh Sherman to Peter Ustinov, as well as more general quotes relating to concepts such as government and the social construction of reality, from people such as Oscar Wilde and H.L. Mencken.

Wilson later published the final part of the Cosmic Trigger trilogy, Cosmic Trigger III: My Life After Death, in 1995.

The trilogy
Cosmic Trigger I: The Final Secret of the Illuminati
Cosmic Trigger II: Down to Earth
Cosmic Trigger III: My Life After Death

External links 
 Excerpt from Cosmic Trigger II

1991 books
American autobiographies
Discordianism
Works about the Illuminati